Cordillerodexia is a genus of bristle flies in the family Tachinidae.

Species
Cordillerodexia colombiana Townsend, 1929
Cordillerodexia orientalis Townsend, 1927

References

Dexiinae
Diptera of South America
Taxa named by Charles Henry Tyler Townsend
Tachinidae genera